The 1985–86 Phoenix Suns season was the 18th season for the Phoenix Suns of the National Basketball Association. The Suns finished the regular season tied with their third-worst record to that point, going just 32–50. Coupled with every team in the Western Conference's Midwest division finishing with a better record than all but two teams from the Pacific division, and the Suns were out of the playoffs for the first time in eight seasons, ending a then-franchise record streak for consecutive playoff berths. The Suns were led by head coach John MacLeod, in his 13th year with the Suns, and played all home games in Arizona Veterans Memorial Coliseum.

Walter Davis bounced back from injury that caused him to miss the majority of the previous season, leading the Suns in scoring at 22 points per game, his highest output since his 1978–79 season with the Suns. Phoenix boasted a pair of 20–20 scorers, as Larry Nance continued to increase his scoring each season since being drafted five seasons ago by Phoenix, with a 20.2 average a game for the season. Nance would finish the season ranked third in the NBA in field goal percentage and lead the Suns in rebounds. Mike Sanders came off the bench and appeared in all 82 regular season games, averaging a career-high 11.0 points a game.

Offseason

NBA Draft

Roster
{| class="toccolours" style="font-size: 85%; width: 100%;"
|-
! colspan="2" style="background-color: #423189;  color: #FF8800; text-align: center;" | Phoenix Suns roster
|- style="background-color: #FF8800; color: #423189;   text-align: center;"
! Players !! Coaches
|-
| valign="top" |

* – Stats with the Suns.
† – Minimum 300 field goals made.

Transactions

Trades

Free agents

Additions

Subtractions

References

 Standings on Basketball Reference

Phoenix Suns seasons
Phoe